Akram Al-Selwi  (Arabic: اكرم الصلوي) (born 8 September 1986) is a Yemeni football forward who is currently playing for Al-Hilal Al-Sahili. He is also a member of the Yemen national football team. Al-Selwi played for Yemen at the 2003 FIFA U-17 World Championship in Finland.

Career

Akram plays for Al-Hilal Al-Sahili from Al Hudaydah, Yemen.  He is left footed and he can play on left midfield and central midfield position, as well as an attacker.

Honours

Club
Al-Hilal Al-Sahili

Yemeni League: 1
 2008–09

Country
Yemen U17
FIFA U-17 World Cup
Group Stage: 2003

References

External links 
 

1986 births
Living people
Yemeni footballers
Yemen international footballers
Yemeni expatriate footballers
Yemeni expatriate sportspeople in Sudan
Expatriate footballers in Sudan
Association football forwards
Al Yarmuk Al Rawda players
Al-Hilal Club (Omdurman) players
Al-Hilal Al-Sahili players
Yemeni League players